Scorpion Moon is the seventh studio album by Japanese singer Thelma Aoyama, released October 27, 2021, by Universal J. The album was preceded by the release of three singles, "Ikiterudakede Gohōbi", "1LDK" and "Yours Forever" featuring Aisho Nakajima. Additionally, a promotional single, "Stay with Me" was released. A fourth single, "No No No" was issued on the day of the album's release.

Scorpion Moon debuted and peaked at number 218 on the Japan Oricon Albums Chart, which became Aoyama's lowest charting album, which previously was her fourth studio album Lovely Angel (2014).

Background 

In August 2021, Aoyama announced her single "Yours Forever" with Aisho Nakajima. The song was her first single in a year and a half. Shortly after, Aoyama announced her new album and its title a week after the release of "Yours Forever". The album was scheduled for release on her birthday, October 27th. Music videos were released for "Stay with Me", "No No No" and "Yours Forever". The album was planned to be released in 2020 but was delayed due to the COVID-19 pandemic. The album title came from Aoyama's astrological sign, Scorpio.

Composition and lyrics 
Musically, Scorpion Moon is an R&B and hip hop album. Regarding Aoyama's musical shift from her ballad songs, she stated, "...I still sing ballads, but now I can include songs that I can enjoy as well." The album also features bilingual lyrics in both Japanese and English.

Promotion 
In promotion of the album, Aoyama appeared in a radio show on September 6, 2021. She also appeared in another radio show on October 27. Aoyama hosted a listening session, Thelma Aoyama Special Lounge Listening Party. The listening event was hosted on October 29.

Track listing

Notes 

 Tracks 3–6 and 12 are stylized in lower case lettering.
 Tracks 8 and 9 are stylized in all upper case lettering.
 Tracks 7 and 13 are titled in Japanese.
 Track 10 is stylized as "BOi ByE".

Charts

Release history

References 

Thelma Aoyama albums
Universal Music Group albums
Albums postponed due to the COVID-19 pandemic
Universal J albums